ESPN College Hoops (sometimes mislabeled as ESPN College Basketball 2K4) is an American college basketball video game which was initially released on November 13, 2003 for PlayStation 2 and Xbox. It is the sequel to the debut game of the series, NCAA College Basketball 2K3, and the first game in the series to feature the ESPN license. It features former Texas Longhorns and retired NBA guard T. J. Ford on the cover.

Reception

The game was met with positive reception upon release.  GameRankings and Metacritic gave it a score of 82.30% and 83 out of 100 for the PlayStation 2 version, and 79.61% and 80 out of 100 for the Xbox version.

References

External links

2003 video games
College basketball video games in the United States
PlayStation 2 games
Xbox games
Multiplayer and single-player video games
ESPN video games
Video games developed in the United States